The 1920 Montana Grizzlies football team was an American football team that represented the University of Montana as an independent during the 1920 college football season. In their second of three seasons under head coach Bernie Bierman, the Grizzlies compiled a 4–3 record and outscored opponents by a total of 227 to 92. Tackle Swede Dalberg was the team captain.

Coach Bierman was 26 years old during the 1920 season. He went on to coach the Minnesota Golden Gophers football team from 1932 to 1950 and was inducted into the College Football Hall of Fame in 1955.

The team played its home games at Dornblaser Field in Missoula, Montana.

Schedule

Players
The following players participated on the 1920 Montana football team: Asterisks identify the 18 players who received varsity letters.

 Harry Adams (*) - halfback and quarterback
 Tick Baird (*) - halfback
 Barry (*)
 Dwight Carver (*) - end
 Swede DaHlberg (*) - tackle and captain
 Cubs Daylis (*) - end
 Frog de Mers (*) - guard
 Jim Dorsey (*) - end
 Jelly Elliott (*) - guard
 Eugene Finch
 Paul Freeman (*) - center
 Jimmy Harris (*) - guard and halfback
 Larry Higbee (*) - halfback
 Bullet Joe Kershner (*) - fullback
 Lloyd Madsen (*) - end
 McGowan (*)
 Jimmy Morris
 Gil Porter - quarterback
 Ramsey (*)
 Steve Sullivan (*) - back
 Bill Walterskirchen (*) - center

References

Montana
Montana Grizzlies football seasons
Montana football